{{infobox person
| name = Wan Jen
| image = Wan Jen01.jpg
| alt = 
| caption = Jen at Festival international des cinémas d'Asie 2010
| birth_date = 
| birth_place = Taipei, Taiwan
| spouse = Su Ming-Ming 蘇明明 (1996-present)
| children = son Wan Yongli 萬永立
| awards = Crystal Simorgh: Best Screenplay 1995 Super Citizen KoSilver Screen Awards: Special Jury Prize, FIPRESCI/NETPAC Award 1999 Connection by Fate| module = 
}}Wan Jen' (born 1950, Taipei) is a Taiwanese filmmaker.Zhang, Yingjin & Xiao, Zhiwei. "Wan Jen" in Encyclopedia of Chinese Film. Taylor & Francis (1998), p. 351. . He is a member of Taiwan's New Wave cinema movement of the 1980s.

Biography

After graduating foreign languages department at Soochow University, he moved to USA, where he received MA in Film from Columbia College in California.Lee, Daw-Ming. "Wan Jen" in Historical Dictionary of Taiwan Cinema. (2013), p. 387. . While in America, he managed to create two well-received short films. In the early 80s he came back to Taiwan. In 1983 he was invited to direct one of the segments in an omnibus film The Sandwich Man. His episode is entitled The Taste of Apple (蘋果的滋味). The two other parts were directed by Hou Hsiao-hsien and Zeng Chuang-hsiang. This movie, together with another anthology film - In Our Time (1982) - is considered a landmark in the emergence of the so-called Taiwanese New Wave.Douglas Kellner, "New Taiwan Cinema in the 80s", Jump Cut, 42 (December 1998): pp. 101-115. Among his other films, the most significant are Ah Fei (1984), Super Citizen Ko (1995) and Connection by Fate (1998).

Wan Jen focuses mainly on issues concerning Taiwanese society - both historical and current ones. His works are valued for their political and social criticism. In 1996, the Chinese Writer's & Artist's Association awarded him the Chinese Arts Medal for his achievements in the field of film. His wife, Su Ming-Ming, is an actress.

Filmography (as director)

References

Sources
 Daw-Ming Lee. "Chin, Han". Historical Dictionary of Taiwan Cinema. (2013), pp. 387–389. . 
 Zhang, Yingjin & Xiao, Zhiwei. "Wan Jen" in Encyclopedia of Chinese Film''. Taylor & Francis (1998), p. 351. .

External links

 cinepedia.cn — 万仁

Film directors from Taipei
Taiwanese film producers
Living people
1950 births